Pennantia is the sole genus in the plant family Pennantiaceae. In older classifications, it was placed in the family Icacinaceae. Most authorities have recognised three or four species, depending on whether they recognised Pennantia baylisiana as a separate species from Pennantia endlicheri. British-born botanist David Mabberley has recognised two species.

The species are small to medium, sometimes multi-trunked trees. Leaves are alternate, leathery, and with entire or sometimes toothed margins. Inflorescences are terminal and flowers are functionally unisexual; the species are more or less dioecious.

Pennantia species grow naturally in New Zealand, Norfolk Island, and eastern Australia. In Australia, P. cunninghamii grows across a broad latitudinal natural range (nearly ), from the south coast of New South Wales northwards through to north eastern Queensland.

The genus name, Pennantia, is in honor of Thomas Pennant, an 18th century Welsh zoologist and author.

Species 
The following four species were recognised by New Zealand botanists Rhys O. Gardner and Peter J. de Lange in 2002.
 Pennantia baylisiana,  – Three Kings Islands
 Pennantia corymbosa , 'kaikōmako' – New Zealand
 Pennantia cunninghamii , 'brown beech' – NSW, Qld, Australia
 Pennantia endlicheri  – Norfolk Island

References

External links 
 Missouri Botanical Garden Website−Mobot.org: Pennantiaceae + Pennantia

Pennantiaceae
Apiales genera
Taxonomy articles created by Polbot
Dioecious plants